A Will of their Own is a 1998 American television miniseries directed by Karen Arthur. The film follows six generations of females within one family, and their struggle for power and independence in America. The film debuted on October 18, 1998, on the NBC network to strong critical reviews. It was released to DVD late 2003.

Plot
The film begins in the 1890s and ends in the 1980s.

Annie Jermaine (Aylesworth) immigrates from Europe to America where she becomes a housemaid for a wealthy doctor. She breaks class restrictions when she marries the doctor's son and begins training as a nurse. However, she is unable to utilize her knowledge due to the popular belief that women were not capable of practicing medicine.

Amanda Steward (Thompson) is a young woman who aspires to become a photographer but is turned down because she is a woman. She goes through life in trying to help women and make them stronger.

Sarah (Jefferson) faces difficulties being the wife of a powerful U.S. senator.

Susan (Ross) is a hippie who becomes a doctor and later opens up a health clinic for battered women.

Jesse (Braga) is a farm worker who walked the fields of the San Joaquin Valley for nearly half a century.  She is the first female organizer for the United Farm Workers.  Seeing those around her struggle and sometimes die because of poor living and working conditions, she wanted to help and joined Caesar Chavez to make a change.

Cast
 Lea Thompson.....Amanda Steward
 Ellen Burstyn.....Veronica Steward
 Faye Dunaway.....Margaret Sanger
 Thomas Gibson.....James MacClaren
 Sônia Braga..... Jessie Lopez De La Cruz
 Reiko Aylesworth.....Annie Jermaine
 Tovah Feldshuh.....Mrs. Rubenstein
Paris Jefferson.....Sarah
 Charlotte Ross.....Susan
 Eric McCormack.....Pierce Peterson
 Diana Scarwid.....Crystal Eastman
 John Shea.....Dr. Jonathan Abbott
 Lew Keathley.....Doorman at the Waldorf Astoria

Awards and nominations
Motion Picture Sound Editors
Nominated, "Best Sound Editing - Television Mini-Series - Dialogue & ADR unknown"
Nominated, "Best Sound Editing - Television Mini-Series - Music unknown"

References

External links

1990s American television miniseries
1998 drama films
1998 films
1990s English-language films
Television series set in the 1890s
Television series set in the 20th century
Television series about the history of the United States
Television shows based on American novels
Television series by The Wolper Organization
Films shot in St. Louis
Films directed by Karen Arthur